Zena is a hamlet (and census-designated place) in Ulster County, New York, United States.  As of the 2020 census the population was 1,038.

Zena is in the Town of Woodstock on County Route 30. The community is northwest of Kingston. Zena is one of the more wealthy areas of this region, with the average home value above $300,000.

Geography
Zena is located at  (42.022311, -74.085908).

Zena is bordered on the west by Morey Hill Rd, extends north through Zena Highwoods Rd until Church Rd., also north halfway up John Joy Rd. It extends north on Zena Rd, almost all the way to State Route 212. On the northern end, it also includes the southern half of Chestnut Hill Rd and most of Witchtree Rd.

Demographics

As of the census of 2000, there were 1,119 people, 447 households, and 320 families residing in the CDP. The population density was 379.8 per square mile (146.5/km2). There were 501 housing units at an average density of 170.0/sq mi (65.6/km2). The racial makeup of the CDP was 94.37% White, 1.79% African American, 0.09% Native American, 1.97% Asian, 0.09% Pacific Islander, 0.71% from other races, and 0.98% from two or more races. Hispanic or Latino of any race were 1.52% of the population.

There were 447 households, out of which 28.4% had children under the age of 18 living with them, 60.0% were married couples living together, 8.7% had a female householder with no husband present, and 28.2% were non-families. 21.5% of all households were made up of individuals, and 7.6% had someone living alone who was 65 years of age or older. The average household size was 2.49 and the average family size was 2.93.

In the CDP, the population was spread out, with 22.9% under the age of 18, 3.6% from 18 to 24, 22.8% from 25 to 44, 32.9% from 45 to 64, and 17.9% who were 65 years of age or older. The median age was 45 years. For every 100 females, there were 87.4 males. For every 100 females age 18 and over, there were 90.1 males.

The median income for a household in the CDP was $62,566, and the median income for a family was $80,945. Males had a median income of $48,523 versus $39,500 for females. The per capita income for the CDP was $32,084. About 3.3% of families and 5.9% of the population were below the poverty line, including 10.4% of those under age 18 and 1.5% of those age 65 or over.

References

Woodstock, New York
Census-designated places in New York (state)
Hamlets in New York (state)
Census-designated places in Ulster County, New York
Hamlets in Ulster County, New York